Darragh O'Connell (born 19 December 1990) is an Irish sportsperson. He has played club hurling with Cuala and Abbeydorney, and inter-county hurling with Kerry and Dublin.

Club

Abbeydorney

O'Connell first played with Abbeydorney. In 2008, he captained the club to the 2008 Kerry Minor Hurling Championship.

Cula

In 2015, he joined Dublin club Cuala. He picked up a Dublin Senior Club Hurling Championship in his first season.

In 2016, he made it back-to-back Dublin Senior Club Hurling Championship titles, and later added a Leinster Senior Club Hurling Championship. Cula later qualified for the All-Ireland Senior Club Hurling Championship final on St.Patrick's Day 2017.

Intercounty
In 2010 in his first year as part of the senior team he helped Kerry win the National League Div 3A title and later to a place in the Christy Ring Cup final which Kerry lost by a point to Westmeath; he later won a Christy Ring Cup All Star. In 2011, Kerry were back in the Christy Ring Cup final; this time they won beating Wicklow. He also won All Ireland Under 21 B titles in 2009, 2010 and 2011.

He was part of the Under 21 Hurling/Shinty International team in 2010 and was captain of the team in 2011.

After playing with Kerry for several years, he later moved to Dublin.

Honours
Kerry
Christy Ring Cup (1): 2011
All-Ireland 'B' Under-21 Hurling Championship (3): 2009, 2010, 2011
National Hurling League 3A (1): 2010

Cuala
Dublin Senior Club Hurling Championship (5): 2015, 2016, 2017, 2019, 2020 (c)
Leinster Senior Club Hurling Championship (2): 2016, 2017
All-Ireland Senior Club Hurling Championship (2): 2017, 2018

Abbeydorney
Kerry Minor Hurling Championship(1): 2008

References

1990 births
Living people
Abbeydorney hurlers
Cuala hurlers
Kerry inter-county hurlers
Dublin inter-county hurlers